This list of mammals of Oregon includes all wild mammal species living in or recently extirpated from the U.S. state of Oregon or its coastal shores. This list includes all species from the lists published by the American Society of Mammalogists or found in the comprehensive text Land Mammals of Oregon published in 1998. Rare instances where these lists disagree are noted. Species are grouped by order and then listed in sortable tables by family. Subspecies present in the region are discussed in the notes. The IUCN Red List status for each species is presented. Images presented are from Oregon or adjacent states, as possible. Species found only in captivity are not listed.

Oregon mammals by order
Table has not been updated for threatened species, thus all are listed "n/a".

Conservation statuses

Species are classified in nine groups, set through criteria such as rate of decline, population size, area of geographic distribution, degree of population and distribution fragmentation. The tables below reclassified results before 1994 to reflect the current rating system.

Terrestrial mammals

Carnivora

The gray wolf has recolonized Oregon especially in the northeast and is included in the list below. The grizzly bear was extirpated from the state in approximately 1940. Since it is included in Land Mammals of Oregon, it is included in the list below.

Chiroptera

Rodentia

The North Oregon Coast population of red tree voles (Arborimus longicaudus) are candidates for protection under the Endangered Species Act.

Artiodactyla

Eulipotyphla

Lagomorpha
The order Lagomorpha consists of two living families: the Leporidae (hares and rabbits) and the Ochotonidae (pikas). The name of the order is derived from the Greek lagos (λαγός, "hare") and morphē (μορφή, "form"). There are eight species in Oregon.

Didelphimorphia
There is only one species from the order Didelphimorphia in the state.

Marine mammals

Cetacea

See also

Fauna of Oregon
List of prehistoric mammals
Lists of mammals by region
Mammal classification
List of mammals described in the 2000s

References

Species range maps using extent points to develop:
Hall, E. Raymond & Kelson, Keith R. (1959). The Mammals of North America. Ronald Press Co., New York. 2 vols., xxx + 1162 pp.
Hall, E. R. (1981). The Mammals of North America. 2nd ed. John Wiley and Sons, New York
Species range maps that support current ranges developed were done by Thomas A. O'Neil and Margaret M. Shaughnessy by reviewing over 150,000 museum records and developing them in a GIS tied to wildlife-habitat types and elevation. 
Csuti, B.; Kimmerling, J.; Shaughnessy, M. & Huso, M. (1997). Atlas of Oregon Wildlife. Oregon State Press. Corvallis, OR. 492 pp.
Csuti, B.; O'Neil, T. A. & Shaughnessy, M. M. (2001). Atlas of Oregon Wildlife (Second Edition, Revised and Expanded). Oregon State University Press, Corvallis, OR. 525 pp.

Bibliography

External links

Mammals
Oregon
Mammals of Oregon